Teo Petani (born March 2, 1988) is a Croatian professional basketball player for Sonik-Puntamika of the Croatian League.

References

External links
Profile at realgm.com

1988 births
Living people
GKK Šibenik players
Croatian men's basketball players
Guards (basketball)
Basketball players from Zadar
KK Borik Puntamika players
KK Jazine Arbanasi players